
This is a list of events related to architecture in the 1230s.

Buildings and structures

Buildings
 1230
 Santa Maria della Spina, Pisa, Italy built
 Ponte Vella at Ourense in Galicia (Spain) rebuilt on Roman foundations
 Luna Vasahi of the Dilwara Temples in India built
 Church of the Jacobins in Toulouse is begun
 Chateau d'Angers begun.
 1234
 Aqsab Mosque, Damascus, Syria built
 Saint-Martin Church, Colmar begun
 1235
 Limburg Cathedral in the Holy Roman Empire consecrated
 Great Hall of Winchester Castle in England completed to a "double cube" design
 Approximate date – Saint-Léger of Guebwiller in the Holy Roman Empire is completed
 1238
 Construction of the Alhambra in Granada begins; it is said that each sovereign of the dynasty of the Nasrides brings a stone to the edifice, and by the end of the Reconquista in 1492, the latest refinements to the palace will have been completed
 Torre dei Conti built in Rome
 1239 – St. Mark Basilica of Heraklion, Venetian Crete, built

References

Architecture